Ephialtini is a tribe of ichneumon wasps in the family Ichneumonidae. There are about 53 genera and at least 120 species in Ephialtini.

Genera
These 17 genera belong to the tribe Ephialtini:

 Acropimpla Townes, 1960 c g b
 Acrotaphus Townes & Townes, 1960 c g b
 Calliephialtes Ashmead, 1900 c g b
 Clistopyga Gravenhorst, 1829 c g b
 Dolichomitus Smith, 1877 c g b
 Endromopoda Hellén, 1939 c g b
 Ephialtes Gravenhorst, 1829 c g b
 Eruga Townes & Townes, 1960 c g b
 Exeristes Förster, 1869 c g b
 Iseropus Förster, 1869 c g b
 Oxyrrhexis Förster, 1869 c g b
 Scambus Hartig, 1838 g b
 Schizopyga Gravenhorst, 1829 c g b
 Sinarachna Townes, 1960 c g b
 Tromatobia Förster, 1869 c g b
 Zaglyptus Förster, 1869 g b
 Zatypota Förster, 1869 c g b

Data sources: i = ITIS, c = Catalogue of Life, g = GBIF, b = Bugguide.net

References

Further reading

External links

 

Pimplinae